George Richard Mackarness (30 March 1823 – 20 April 1883) was Bishop of Argyll and The Isles in the Scottish Episcopal Church in the last third of the 19th century.

Mackarness was the second son of John Mackarness, a West India merchant of Elstree House, Bath. He was educated at Merton College, Oxford and ordained in 1846. He held incumbencies at Ilam, Lochgilphead and Oban.

He died on 20 April 1883. His older brother John was the Bishop of Oxford from 1870 until 1889.

References

1823 births
19th-century Scottish Episcopalian bishops
Bishops of Argyll and The Isles
1883 deaths
Alumni of Merton College, Oxford